Marita Lindahl  (17 October 1938 – 21 March 2017) was a Finnish model and beauty queen who won the 1957 Miss World beauty pageant, after being crowned Miss Finland 1957 by Miss Finland 1956, Sirpa Helena Koivu. She became the first woman from Finland to win the title and the third Nordic woman; after Sweden had won the two first contests.

The pageant was held in London, England.  Lindahl was described by pageant director Eric Morley as having "the haunting beauty and intrigue of a Greta Garbo".  The first runner-up was Lilian Madsen from Denmark, second runner-up Adele Kruger from South Africa and third runner-up Jacqueline Tapia from Tunisia.

Lindahl ran one of the most popular restaurants in Helsinki.
Later she moved to England. She lived in Oxford.

References

Miss World winners
Miss Finland winners
1938 births
Miss World 1957 delegates
2017 deaths
Finnish expatriates in the United Kingdom